Anton Krasnoshtanov (June 10, 1986, Vitim, Sakha Republic, Yakut Autonomous Soviet Socialist Republic) is a Russian political figure and deputy of the 8th State Duma. He is the son of the deputy of the 7th State Duma  

In 2008, Anton Krasnoshtanov graduated from the Siberian State Interregional College of Construction and Entrepreneurship. In 2014, he also got a degree from the Irkutsk State Transport University. In 2017, he became the deputy of the Legislative Assembly of Irkutsk Oblast. He left his post in November 2020 to become a member of the Irkutsk administration. Since September 2021, he has served as deputy of the 8th State Duma.

References

1986 births
Living people
United Russia politicians
21st-century Russian politicians
Seventh convocation members of the State Duma (Russian Federation)
Eighth convocation members of the State Duma (Russian Federation)